The 2000 Anchorage mayoral election was held on April 4 and May 2, 2000, to elect the mayor of Anchorage, Alaska. It saw election of George Wuerch.

Incumbent mayor Rick Mystrom was term-limited.

Proposition 10, passed in 1999, required mayoral candidates to receive 50% of the votes cast in a race to avoid a runoff. Since no candidate had received a majority of the vote in the first round, a runoff was held between the top-two finishers.

Results

First round

Runoff

References

See also

Anchorage
Anchorage
2000
Mark Begich